Lynn McRee is an actress known for her role as Maureen Prescott in the Scream film series.

Filmography

Film

References

External links
 

Nationality missing
Year of birth missing (living people)
20th-century American actresses
21st-century American actresses
Living people